Saint Anne Township is one of seventeen townships in Kankakee County, Illinois, USA.  As of the 2010 census, its population was 2,191 and it contained 943 housing units.  The township was created on March 11, 1857 from parts of Aroma Township.

Geography

Cities, towns, villages
 St. Anne

Adjacent townships
 Ganeer Township (north)
 Pembroke Township (east)
 Beaverville Township, Iroquois County (southeast)
 Papineau Township, Iroquois County (southwest)
 Aroma Township (northwest)

Major highways
  Illinois Route 1

Lakes
 Cote Lake

Demographics

Government
The township is governed by an elected Town Board of a supervisor and four trustees.  The township also has an elected assessor, clerk, highway commissioner and supervisor.  The township Office is located at  471 West Sheffield, St. Anne, IL 60964.

Political districts
 Illinois's 11th congressional district
 State House District 79
 State Senate District 40

School districts
 St. Anne Community Consolidated School District 256
 St. Anne Community High School District 302

References
 
 United States Census Bureau 2007 TIGER/Line Shapefiles
 United States National Atlas

External links
 Village of St. Anne official site
 Kankankee County Official Site
 City-Data.com
 Illinois State Archives

Townships in Kankakee County, Illinois
Populated places established in 1857
Townships in Illinois
1857 establishments in Illinois